Amelia Frid (born 30 July 1975 in Soviet Union) is an Australian former child actress who played Cody Willis in Neighbours. She retired from acting to concentrate on studies and her current profession is forensic psychology. Frid's final appearance in Neighbours as Cody Willis was 30 July 1991 which was her 16th birthday.

In 1988, Frid was cast as Molly in Adventures on Kythera. The series was not broadcast in Australia until 1991. Frid's final acting work was with former Neighbours co-star Ashley Paske (who played Matt Robinson) in Oxford where she played the princess in Aladdin.

Filmography

References

External links
 

1975 births
Australian television actresses
Australian child actresses
Australian psychologists
Forensic psychologists
Living people